The North Atlantic air ferry route was a series of Air Routes over the North Atlantic Ocean on which aircraft were ferried from the United States and Canada to Great Britain during World War II to support combat operations in the European Theater of Operations (ETO).

The route was developed as one of four major routes along which United States aircraft were ferried to the major combat areas.  It originated at several Army Air Bases in New England, which permitted short range single-engined aircraft to be flown to Britain using a series of intermediate airfields in Newfoundland, Labrador, Greenland and Iceland.  Long-range multi-engined aircraft could be flown from Newfoundland directly using Great Circle routes to airfields in Ireland and southwest England; or via the Azores to the UK or airfields in French Morocco to support Allied air forces in the Mediterranean Theater of Operations (MTO). Later in the war, air routes over the North Atlantic were developed from South Florida via Bermuda to the Azores.

Origins

Although many air route surveys of the North Atlantic had been made in the 1930s, by the outbreak of World War II in Europe, civilian trans-Atlantic air service was just becoming a reality. It was soon suspended in favor of military activities. The increasing need for Britain and France to obtain military aircraft in the United States revived interest in intermediate airfields along the "stepping stone" of the North Atlantic.

 Although airports existed in Newfoundland, and Britain built an airfield in Reykjavik, Iceland (1940), the only practical way to get short-range aircraft to Europe was by cargo ship.

With the Fall of France in June 1940, and the loss of much war materiel on the continent, the need for the British to purchase replacement materiel from the United States was urgent.  Aircraft ordered by France and also by the Netherlands were impounded.  The aircraft purchased in the United States by Britain were flown to airports in Nova Scotia and Newfoundland, partially dis-assembled and loaded on ships and transported to England where they were unloaded and re-assembled, a process that could take several weeks, not counting repairing any damage to the aircraft incurred in the shipment.  In addition, German U-boats operating in the North Atlantic Ocean were a constant menace to shipping routes in the North Atlantic making it very hazardous for merchant shipping between Newfoundland and Great Britain. Larger aircraft could be flown to the UK and the Atlantic Ferry Organization was set up to manage this using civilian pilots.

On 2 September 1940, the Destroyers for Bases Agreement was completed. In exchange for fifty obsolete destroyers, the U. S. got ninety-nine-year leases for air and naval bases in the Dominion of Newfoundland, Bermuda, British Guiana, Antigua, Trinidad, St. Lucia, Jamaica and the Bahamas. (Technically, not all bases were exchanged; some were "gifted.")

Although Iceland was viewed as a part of Europe, Greenland was considered a part of North America and subject to the Monroe doctrine. President Roosevelt vetoed Canadian and British plans for the occupation of the island.  In 1940, Greenland was subject to a U.S. protectorate enforced by the U.S. Coast Guard, and a survey for airfields was made. On 9 April 1941, the United States signed a treaty with the defected Danish Ambassador in Washington, allowing for unlimited U.S. military use of the island. The agreement, after explicitly recognizing Danish sovereignty over Greenland, granted to the United States the right to locate and construct aircraft landing fields and other facilities for the defense of Greenland and for the defense of the North American continent.  President Roosevelt then authorized the War Department to build airfields and other facilities in Greenland. The United States had also taken over the defense of Iceland under an agreement with Britain in July 1941, relieving the British Empire troops then in Iceland.  United States Army engineers began improving the airstrips previously begun by the British.

Using these new airfields in Newfoundland, Greenland and Iceland, land based air routes were developed to transport United States aircraft, soldiers and war supplies between the United States and the United Kingdom.

North Atlantic Route
Under the Destroyers for Bases Agreement, the first United States troops arrived in Newfoundland on 29 January 1941.  The first USAAF presence in Newfoundland came in May 1941 when six Douglas B-18 Bolos from the First Air Force 21st Reconnaissance Squadron arrived at RCAF Station Gander.  Attached to the 21st Recon was Captain Elliott Roosevelt, the son of the president. He made the 1941 surveys that resulted in construction of airports at Goose Bay, Fort Chimo, Frobisher Bay, and Padloping Island. Captain Roosevelt also surveyed Iceland and Greenland and reported to his superiors on the air route development during the Atlantic Conference in August 1941. In September 1941 Canada began the development of Goose Bay in Labrador. The other stations followed in October, but they were built by the United States.

In July 1941, the United States sent construction crews to Narsarsuaq in Greenland to build the air base that came to be known as Bluie West 1 (BW-1), later the headquarters of Greenland Base Command.  The following October, work began on Bluie West 8, a much more northerly base at Sondrestrom on the western coast of Greenland. Next year, on the east coast, an airfield was built 50 kilometers northeast of Angmagssalik (Bluie East 2). This air route was known as the North Atlantic Route, and became one of the major transport and supply routes of World War II.

The North Atlantic Route was initially operated by the 23d Army Air Forces Ferrying Wing, Army Air Forces Ferrying Command, initially headquartered at Presque Isle Army Air Field, Maine. Ferrying Command was re-designated Air Transport Command on 1 July 1942. The 23d Ferrying Wing was replaced by the ATC North Atlantic Division, Grenier Army Air Base, New Hampshire on 1 January 1944. The Royal Air Force counterpart organization was RAF Ferry Command (before mid-1941 known as RAF Atlantic Ferry Service and after March 1943 No. 45 (North Atlantic) Group within RAF Transport Command).

The route was inaugurated in the spring of 1942, with large movements of aircraft taking place during the summer. Many serious problems were encountered, and the total loss rate on the route approached 10%. On 22 November Air Transport Command suspended the transportation of passengers across the North Atlantic for the duration of the winter.  ATC traffic to Great Britain was diverted to the South Atlantic air ferry route in World War II. The distance to Britain by this route was significantly longer, but operations could be maintained on a year-round basis.

Mid-Atlantic Route
Efforts on another front were also productive. Prior to 1943 the Portuguese government only allowed German U-boats and navy ships to refuel in the Azores. However, diplomatic efforts in 1943 persuaded Portuguese Prime Minister António de Oliveira Salazar to lease bases on Azores Islands to the British. This represented a change in policy and was a key turning point in the Battle of the Atlantic allowing the Allies to provide aerial coverage in the middle of the Atlantic.

The British established RAF Lagans Field at an existing airport on Terceira Island, and the United States constructed Santa Maria Field on Santa Maria Island. On 1 December 1943, British and United States military representatives at RAF Lagans Field signed a joint agreement outlining the roles and responsibilities for the USAAF and United States Navy use of RAF Lagans Field. In return, the US agreed to assist the British in improving and extending existing facilities at Lagens. Air Transport Command transport planes began landing at Lagens Field immediately after the agreement was signed.  On 31 December 1943, Prime Minister Salazar gave his consent to the arrangement with the understanding the Americans would be under British control.  By the end of June 1944, more than 1,900 American airplanes had passed through these two airfields in the Azores.

The air routes established allowed long range multi-engined aircraft fitted with auxiliary fuel tanks to be ferried from Morrison Field, in South Florida through Kindley Field, Bermuda to one of the two airfields in the Azores. then on to RAF St Mawgan in Cornwall throughout the year. Single-engine aircraft, however, had to be ferried on the North Atlantic Route due to their shorter ranges.  Also aircraft were ferried from Newfoundland via the Azores to Cornwall.  This route was subsequently designated as the Mid-Atlantic Route. In addition, ATC ferried aircraft to French Morocco to support forces in the Mediterranean Theater of Operations (MTO) from the Azores.

Crimson Route

The Crimson Route was a planned Great Circle route to ferry aircraft from manufacturing plants in Southern California and Seattle via Montana over Canada to Greenland using Arctic air routes.  This route had the advantage of avoiding the poor weather over the North Atlantic by flying over the high latitudes of northern Canada to Greenland, then across Greenland to Iceland and on to Great Britain.  Aircraft manufactured in the Midwest and Eastern United States could be flown north over Ontario or Quebec to Greenland as well, avoiding the often stormy North Atlantic.  Several airfields were developed in northern Canada, and the route was tested by some RAF aircraft, however the project was ended in 1943 by the development of the Mid-Atlantic Route from Florida to the Azores and never fully developed.

Airfields

North Atlantic Route

Mid-Atlantic Route

See also

 South Atlantic air ferry route in World War II
 South Pacific air ferry route in World War II
 Northwest Staging Route
 West Coast Wing (Air Transport Command route to Alaska)
 Crimson Route

References

External links
 Google Maps Distance Calculator (Used for calculating great circle distances)

Aerial operations and battles of World War II involving the United States
Aircraft ferrying
Military history of the Atlantic Ocean
Newfoundland in World War II
Greenland in World War II
1940s in Newfoundland